Ficus crassipes, commonly known as the round-leaved banana fig is a fig that is endemic to the wet tropical rainforests of northeastern Queensland, Australia. It has large brownish cylindrical syconia.

Description
It begins life as a hemiepiphyte.

References

External links

Trees of Australia
Flora of Queensland
crassipes
Rosales of Australia
Epiphytes